The 10th arrondissement of Paris (Xe arrondissement) is one of the 20 arrondissements of the capital city of France. In spoken French, this arrondissement is referred to as dixième ("10th arrondissement of Paris" = "dixième arrondissement de Paris").

The arrondissement, called Entrepôt (warehouse), is situated on the right bank of the River Seine. The arrondissement contains two of Paris's six main railway stations: the Gare du Nord and the Gare de l'Est. Built during the 19th century, these two termini are among the busiest in Europe.

The 10th arrondissement also contains a large portion of the Canal Saint-Martin, linking the northeastern parts of Paris with the River Seine.

Geography
The land area of the arrondissement is 2.892 km2 (1.117 sq. miles, or 715 acres), and it had a 1999 population of 89,695.

The 10th arrondissement is often referred to as l'Entrepôt. Like all Parisian arrondissements, it is divided into four quartiers (districts):
 Saint-Vincent-de-Paul, the 37th quartier, has 21,624 people in an area of 92.7 hectares
 Porte-Saint-Denis, the 38th quartier, has 15,066 people in an area of 47.2 hectares
 Porte-Saint-Martin, the 39th quartier, has 23,125 people in an area of 60.9 hectares
 Hôpital-Saint-Louis, the 40th quartier, has 29,870 people in an area of 88.4 hectares

Demography
The peak population of the 10th arrondissement occurred in 1881, when it had 159,809 inhabitants. Today, the arrondissement remains very dense in both population and business activity, with 89,612 inhabitants and 71,962 jobs at last census in 1999. Due to its large Turkish minority, the 10th arrondissement  is often called "La Petite Turquie" (Little Turkey).

Historical population

Immigration

Map

Cityscape

Places of interest

 Canal Saint-Martin
 Gare de l'Est
 Gare du Nord
 Musée de l'Éventail (museum of fans)
 Passage Brady
 Passage du Prado
 Porte Saint-Denis
 Porte Saint-Martin
 Church of Saint-Vincent-de-Paul
 Church of Saint-Laurent
 Théâtre Antoine-Simone Berriau

Mains streets and squares

Streets

 Rue d'Abbeville
 Rue Albert-Thomas
 Rue Alibert
 Rue d'Alsace
 Rue Ambroise-Paré
 Rue de l'Aqueduc
 Rue Beaurepaire
 Rue de Belzunce
 Rue Bichat
 Boulevard de Bonne-Nouvelle
 Impasse Bonne-Nouvelle
 Rue Bossuet
 Rue Bouchardon
 Passage Brady
 Passage du Buisson-Saint-Louis
 Rue du Buisson-Saint-Louis
 Rue Cail
 Rue de Chabrol
 Rue du Chalet
 Boulevard de la Chapelle
 Rue Charles-Robin
 Rue du Château-d'Eau
 Rue du Château-Landon

 Avenue Claude-Vellefaux
 Rue de Compiègne
 Rue Demarquay
 Boulevard de Denain
 Rue de Dunkerque
 Rue Eugène-Varlin
 Rue du Faubourg-du-Temple
 Rue du Faubourg-Poissonnière
 Rue du Faubourg-Saint-Denis
 Rue du Faubourg-Saint-Martin
 Rue Fénelon
 Rue de la Fidélité
 Rue de la Grange-aux-Belles
 Rue Guy-Patin
 Rue d'Hauteville
 Rue du Huit-Mai-1945
 Rue de l'Hôpital-Saint-Louis
 Rue Jacques-Louvel-Tessier
 Rue Jean-Moinon
 Rue Jean-Poulmarch
 Quai de Jemmapes
 Rue Juliette-Dodu
 Rue La Fayette

 Rue de Lancry
 Rue Léon-Jouhaux
 Rue Louis-Blanc
 Rue Lucien-Sampaix
 Boulevard de Magenta
 Rue de Marseille
 Rue Martel
 Rue de Maubeuge
 Rue de Mazagran
 Rue des Messageries
 Rue de Metz
 Rue Monseigneur-Rodhain
 Rue de Nancy
 Rue de Paradis
 Avenue Parmentier
 Rue Perdonnet
 Rue des Petites-Écuries
 Rue des Petits-Hôtels
 Rue Philippe-de-Girard
 Rue des Récollets
 Rue René-Boulanger
 Avenue Richerand
 Rue Robert-Blache

 Rue de Rocroy
 Boulevard Saint-Denis
 Impasse Sainte-Marthe
 Rue Sainte-Marthe
 Rue Saint-Laurent
 Boulevard Saint-Martin
 Rue Saint-Maur
 Rue de Saint-Quentin
 Rue Saint-Vincent-de-Paul
 Rue de Sambre-et-Meuse
 Rue Sibour
 Boulevard de Strasbourg
 Rue du Terrage
 Rue Tesson
 Rue Taylor
 Quai de Valmy
 Avenue de Verdun
 Rue Vicq-D'Azir
 Boulevard de la Villette
 Rue des Vinaigriers
 Rue Yves-Toudic

Squares

 Place de la Bataille-de-Stalingrad
 Place du Colonel-Fabien
 Place du Docteur-Alfred-Fournier
 Place Franz-Liszt
 Place Napoléon-III
 Place de la République
 Place de Roubaix
 Place Sainte-Marthe
 Place de Valenciennes
 Square Alban-Satragne

 Square Amadou-Hampate Ba
 Square Aristide-Cavaillé-Col
 Square des Recollets
 Square Eugène-Varlin
 Square Frédérick-Lemaître
 Square Henri-Christiné
 Square Juliette-Dodu
 Square Raoul-Follereau
 Square Robert-Blache
 Square Saint-Laurent

References

External links